Patrick McEnroe was the defending champion but lost in the second round to Richard Fromberg.

Todd Martin won in the final 5–7, 6–3, 6–4 against Goran Ivanišević.

Seeds
A champion seed is indicated in bold text while text in italics indicates the round in which that seed was eliminated.

  Goran Ivanišević (final)
  Richard Krajicek (first round)
  Arnaud Boetsch (first round)
 n/a
  Todd Martin (champions)
  Jan Siemerink (first round)
  Albert Costa (first round)
  Marcelo Ríos (first round)

Draw

References
 1996 Peters International Draw

Men's Singles
Singles